The Mexico national under-17 basketball team, is controlled by the Asociación Deportiva Mexicana de Baloncesto ADEMEBA (Mexican Basketball Association). It represents Mexico in international under-17, under-16, and under-15 (under age 17, under age 16, and under age 15) basketball competitions. 

Its best result was 6th place at the 2017 FIBA Under-16 Americas Championship.

Mexico's U-15 team of the Mexican School Sports Federation won the Gold Medal in the International School Sport Federation by defeating the host Serbia 69-52. Mexico defeated all the rivals it faced in the ISF (International School Sport Federation) Tournament. Mexico defeated North Macedonia 72-47, Serbia 76 - 57, France 71 - 47, and Serbia again in the Championship Game 69 - 52 to become the ISF Basketball World Champions.

Centrobasket U17 championship
2007: Silver medal 
2009: Silver medal 
2011: Silver medal 
2013: Bronze medal

See also
Mexico national basketball team
Mexico women's national basketball team
Mexico national under-19 basketball team
Mexico national 3x3 team

References

External links
Official website
FIBA Profile
Latinbasket – Mexican Men National Team U16/17
Archived records of Mexico team participations

Men's national under-17 basketball teams
Basketball